Alice De Winton (born Alice Catherine Wilson 1870 – 1941) was an English actress.
She was born and died in London.  She was the daughter of Henry Wilson, a retired army surgeon major, and Louisa Ducrow (daughter of equestrian and circus manager Andrew Ducrow).

Selected filmography
 A Cinema Girl's Romance (1915)
 The Marriage of William Ashe (1916)
Sally Bishop (1916)
 A Fair Impostor (1916)
Lady Windermere's Fan (1916)
 The Sorrows of Satan (1917)
 Democracy (1918)
The Woman of the Iron Bracelets (1920)
 The Children of Gibeon (1920)
The Door That Has No Key (1921)
 The Bachelor's Club (1921)

References

External links

1864 births
1941 deaths
English stage actresses
English film actresses
English silent film actresses
20th-century English actresses